Lokon-Empung is a volcano on the island of Sulawesi. It is one of the most active in Indonesia. It consists of two volcanic cones, the older Lokon and the younger Empung. The active crater of Tompaluan is situated in the saddle between the two cones.

Features 
Lokon cone, the older and higher (reaching a height of 1,580 M) of the two cones, has a flat and craterless top. Lokon formed during a period of andesitic volcanism on ring fractures resulting from the Tondano caldera's Late Miocene or Early Pliocene collapse. Empung is the younger of the two cones. The cone has a 400 M wide crater that is 150 M deep. The cone of Empung has erupted twice in historical times (two moderate eruptions in the 14th and 18th centuries), but all subsequent eruptions have originated from the Tompuluan crater.
Tompaluan is a 150 x 250 m wide double crater situated in the saddle between the two peaks, historical eruptions have been reported from the crater since the mid-19th century.

Eruptive history 

Historical eruptions have been reported since 1375 (give or take 25 years). The first two eruptions came from the Empung cone, both the eruptions were VEI 3's. Eruptions since 1829 have been from the Tompaluan Crater. Most eruptions from the crater have been mild Phreatic eruptions, but Lava domes and lava flows have also been erupted.

References

 VolcanoLive

Volcanoes of Sulawesi
Active volcanoes of Indonesia
Landforms of North Sulawesi